The Minister for Foreign Affairs (commonly shortened to Foreign Minister) is the minister in the Government of Australia who is responsible for overseeing the international diplomacy section of the Department of Foreign Affairs and Trade. Senator Penny Wong was appointed as Foreign Minister in the ministry led by Prime Minister Anthony Albanese in May 2022 following the 2022 Australian federal election. As the first female foreign minister from the Australian Labor Party, Wong also became the third female foreign minister in a row, following Julie Bishop and Marise Payne. The Foreign Minister is one of two cabinet-level portfolio ministers under the Department of Foreign Affairs and Trade, the other being the Minister for Trade and Tourism Senator Don Farrell.

Several subordinate positions include the Minister for International Development and the Pacific, currently held by Pat Conroy, and the Assistant Minister for Foreign Affairs, currently held by Tim Watts.

Scope

The minister is usually one of the most senior members of Cabinet – the position is equivalent to that of Secretary of State for Foreign and Commonwealth Affairs in Britain or Secretary of State in the United States – as shown by the fact that eleven Prime Ministers of Australia have also worked as the Minister for Foreign Affairs. The minister is seen as one of the people most responsible for formulating Australia's foreign policy, as they along with other relevant ministers advise the Prime Minister in developing and implementing foreign policy, and also acts as the government's main spokesperson on international affairs issues. In recent times, the minister also undertakes numerous international trips to meet with foreign representatives and Heads of State or Government.

List of ministers for foreign affairs
The portfolio has existed continuously since 1901, except for the period 14 November 1916 to 21 December 1921. Prior to 6 November 1970, the office was known as the Minister for External Affairs.  Between 24 July 1987 and 24 March 1993 it was known as the Minister for Foreign Affairs and Trade. Starting with the Keating Government, the Trade portfolio has been administered separately by the Minister for Trade.

The following individuals have been appointed as Minister for Foreign Affairs, or any of its precedent titles:

Notes
 Also served as Prime Minister for some or all of their term.
 Barton was knighted in 1902, while serving as Minister.

List of Ministers for International Development and the Pacific
The Minister for International Development was responsible, in the Rudd Cabinet, for the Australian Agency for International Development (AusAID) and the international development and humanitarian aid policies of the Commonwealth of Australia, administered through the Department of Foreign Affairs and Trade (DFAT). AusAID was abolished by the incoming prime minister, Tony Abbott, in September 2013 and under the operations of the Abbott Cabinet its functions were absorbed into DFAT.

The following individuals have been appointed as Minister for International Development and the Pacific, or any precedent title:

List of ministers assisting the minister for foreign affairs
The following individuals have been appointed as Minister assisting the Minister for Foreign Affairs or any of its precedent titles:

List of parliamentary secretaries and assistant ministers for foreign affairs
The following individuals have been appointed as parliamentary secretaries and assistant ministers for Foreign Affairs or any of its precedent titles:

List of parliamentary secretaries and assistant ministers for international development and the pacific
The following individuals have been appointed as parliamentary secretaries and assistant ministers for Foreign Affairs or any of its precedent titles:

Former ministerial titles

List of ministers for tourism
Since 1966, Australia had ministers responsible for tourism under various titles. The following individuals have been appointed as Minister for Tourism, or any of its precedent titles:

See also
 List of High Commissioners and Ambassadors of Australia

References

External links

 

 
Foreign_Affairs
Australia